This is a record of Honduras results at the FIFA World Cup. They made their debut in 1982 FIFA World Cup in Spain

Overall record

Spain 1982

Spain vs Honduras

Honduras vs Northern Ireland

Honduras vs Yugoslavia

South Africa 2010

All times local (UTC+2)

Honduras vs Chile

Spain vs Honduras

Switzerland vs Honduras

Brazil 2014

France vs Honduras

Honduras vs Ecuador

Honduras vs Switzerland

Record players

Goalscorers

Three Honduran players have scored one goal each at FIFA World Cup tournaments.

References

External links
 FIFA.com: Honduras on FIFA.com
 FENAFUTH.org: Official Honduran Federation website
1982 FIFA World Cup squad
2010 FIFA World Cup squad
2014 FIFA World Cup squad

 
Honduras
World Cup